A Telegoniometer (a type of goniometer) is a device for varying the phase relationship(s) among two or more antennae in an array.  This is for steering the directionality of the array without physically moving the antennae. the telegoniometer is commonly used for radio direction finding, providing very precise bearings from a sensitive fixed site.

A telegoniometer is simply a goniometer with remote control and readout.  As an example, it is used on unmanned spacecraft for the long-range approach phase of automated docking, before more precise (but shorter-range) optical systems take over.

Dimensional instruments